Bedřiška Kulhavá (born 4 December 1931) is a Czech middle-distance runner. She competed in the women's 800 metres at the 1960 Summer Olympics.

References

1931 births
Living people
Athletes (track and field) at the 1960 Summer Olympics
Czech female middle-distance runners
Olympic athletes of Czechoslovakia
Sportspeople from Ústí nad Labem